Anushirvan (also Romanized as Anūshīrvān; also known as Nūshīrvān) is a village in Milanlu Rural District, in the Central District of Esfarayen County, North Khorasan Province, Iran. At the 2006 census, its population was 120, in 26 families.

References 

Populated places in Esfarayen County